Næss, or Naess, is a Norwegian surname, and may refer to:

Arne Lindtner Næss (born 1944), Norwegian actor
Arne Næss (1912–2009), Norwegian philosopher
Arne Næss (politician) (1925–2009), Norwegian politician
Arne Næss, Jr. (1937–2004), Norwegian mountaineer and businessman
Alfred Næss (1877–1955), Norwegian ice skater
Alfred Næss (playwright) (1927–1997), Norwegian playwright and songwriter
Atle Næss (born 1949), Norwegian writer

Erling Dekke Næss (1901–1993), Norwegian shipowner and businessman
Dagfinn Næss (1934–2008), Norwegian boxer
Jan Christopher Næss (born 1964), Norwegian writer
Kate Næss (1938–1987), Norwegian poet
Knut Næss (1916–2000), Norwegian professor of medicine
Kristine Næss (born 1964), Norwegian writer
Leif Næss (1923–1973), Norwegian rower
Leona Naess (born 1974), singer and songwriter
Mattis Næss (born 1973), Norwegian canoer
Petter Næss (born 1960), Norwegian film director
Randi Lindtner Næss (1905–2009), Norwegian singer
Sigurd E. Naess (1886–1970), American architect who partnered with Charles Murphy (architect) to form Naess & Murphy
Terje Næss (born 1968), Norwegian chef
Tor Berntin Næss (born 1942), Norwegian ambassador

Norwegian-language surnames